William Clayton Dunn (25 March 1920 – 21 December 1982) was an English footballer who made 340 appearances in the Football League playing as a goalkeeper for Darlington.

Dunn was born in Hebburn, County Durham, in 1920, and served in the Royal Air Force during the Second World War. He joined Darlington as a centre half, but was tried in goal in October 1945, "played with confidence and skill", and remained with the club for a further ten years, making 355 appearances in league and cup. In recognition of his long service, Dunn was awarded a benefit match, against Leeds United in May 1956, before he moved into non-league football with North Shields. He died in 1982 in Jarrow at the age of 62.

References

1920 births
1982 deaths
People from Hebburn
Footballers from Tyne and Wear
English footballers
Association football goalkeepers
Darlington F.C. players
North Shields F.C. players
English Football League players
Royal Air Force personnel of World War II